Sphaeralcea ambigua, is a species of flowering plant commonly known as desert globemallow or apricot mallow, is a member of the genus Sphaeralcea in the mallow family (Malvaceae).

It is a perennial shrub native to parts of California, Nevada, Utah, Arizona, and New Mexico in the United States and Sonora and Baja California in northwest Mexico. It is found in the Mojave Desert, Great Basin desert, and Sonoran Desert ecoregions. It is a larval host to the common checkered skipper, northern white skipper, painted lady, small checkered skipper, and West Coast lady.

Description
The leaves (see image) are fuzzy with white hairs on both sides, lobed, palmately veined, and on long stems, the number of which increase with age. The fruit is a brown capsule containing numerous seeds, first quite spherical as implied by the genus name, later flattening to a disk. The flowers are bowl-shaped, five-petaled, apricot to orange in color, and blooming in the spring.

Varieties
Sphaeralcea ambigua has eight or nine named varieties. They include:

Sphaeralcea ambigua A. Gray var. ambigua 
Sphaeralcea ambigua A. Gray var. aculeata Jeps. (synonym for S. a. var. ambigua) 
Sphaeralcea ambigua A. Gray var. rosacea (Munz & I.M. Johnst.) Kearney 
Sphaeralcea ambigua A. Gray var. rugosa (Kearney) Kearney

Uses

The plant is used by members of the Shoshoni tribe of Native Americans, as well as other Indigenous people and settlers in the region, as a food source and medicinal plant.

Cultivation
Sphaeralcea ambigua is cultivated as an ornamental plant by specialty plant nurseries for use in desert and drought tolerant gardens, and a native plant its desert region's natural landscaping and habitat restoration projects. It requires the following conditions:

 Exposure: full sun
 Water: natural rainfall; supplemental water will increase flowering
 Soil: desert soil, tolerant of some clay, prefers good drainage
 Propagation: easy by seed; tricky by vegetative cuttings; best results from first flush of new spring growth
 Maintenance: low, periodically cut back to keep vegetative look

It is winter hardy in USDA Zones 6-10, withstanding temperatures as low as -10F.

References

External links

ITIS Report: Sphaeralcea ambigua
Sphaeralcea ambigua — CalPhotos Gallery

ambigua
Flora of the Sonoran Deserts
Flora of the California desert regions
Flora of the Great Basin
Flora of Arizona
Flora of Nevada
Flora of Baja California
Flora of Sonora
Flora of Utah
Natural history of the Colorado Desert
Natural history of the Mojave Desert
Garden plants of North America
Drought-tolerant plants
Flora without expected TNC conservation status